Moe's Southwest Grill, referred to informally as Moe's, is an American fast casual restaurant franchise chain that was founded in Atlanta, Georgia, in December 2000 by Raving Brands. The name "Moe's" originated as an acronym for "Musicians, Outlaws and Entertainers," and this theme led to the music-related artwork found in the original design.

Moe's Southwest Grill — together with Schlotzsky's, Carvel, Cinnabon, McAlister's Deli, Jamba and Auntie Anne's brands — is part of the Focus Brands portfolio of brands.

The restaurant chain originally featured artwork depicting deceased music legends and licensed a special rock soundtrack from Muzak that consisted of music from deceased musicians or bands with a notable deceased musician. After a lawsuit from the estate of Jerry Garcia, depictions of actual people were removed from the decor. The menu, which initially featured puns based on people and popular phrases from music, television, and movies was revamped to remove nearly all phrases that may result in legal issues.

Fare 
Moe's offers various types of food on its menu, including burritos, tacos, quesadillas, nachos, salads, stacks, burrito bowls, and house-made seasonal salsas. Ingredients can be added or subtracted from the standard entree for customization.  Every order comes with chips and salsa on the side.

International locations 

Moe's no longer franchises any locations outside the United States.

In 2011, Moe's opened its first location outside the United States in Turkey.

In September 2012 Moe's opened its first Russian franchise located in the center of Moscow near the Kremlin on Pyatnitskaya Street.

Franchise partners also existed in Costa Rica and Jamaica.

References

External links 
 

Cuisine of the Western United States
Fast-food Mexican restaurants
Fast-food chains of the United States
Fast-food franchises
Restaurants in Georgia (U.S. state)
2000 establishments in Georgia (U.S. state)
Restaurants established in 2000
Restaurants in Atlanta
American companies established in 2000
2007 mergers and acquisitions